Ivory Act 2018 (c. 30) is an Act of the Parliament of the United Kingdom that introduced a prohibition on dealing in items containing elephant ivory, with limited exemptions. The Act also established a new compliance regime for exempted items, and introduced civil and criminal penalties for those found guilty of breaching the ban.

The Ivory Bill was introduced to the House of Commons as a Government bill by the Environment Secretary, Michael Gove, on 23 May 2018, and to the House of Lords by the Minister for Rural Affairs, Baron Gardiner of Kimble, on 5 July 2018. The Bill was given the Royal Assent on 20 December 2018.

Background 
In September 2016, the British Government announced its intention to introduce a ban on the sale of all ‘worked’ ivory produced after 1947. Any works produced before 1947 would be classified as antiques, and trade in these goods would permitted. This was criticised as the Conservative Party manifesto for the 2015 general election pledged to introduce a total ban on the ivory trade. A petition was launched on the Parliament petitions website in response, gathering more than the 100,000 signatures required to force a debate in Parliament.

The Ivory Bill was introduced to the House of Commons as a Government bill by the Environment Secretary, Michael Gove, on 23 May 2018, and to the House of Lords by the Minister for Rural Affairs, Baron Gardiner of Kimble, on 5 July 2018. The Bill was given the Royal Assent on 20 December 2018.

Act

Prohibition and exceptions 
Section 1 of the Act prohibits dealing in ivory. The Section came into force, thus commencing the ban, on 6 June 2022.

Compliance regime

Penalties

Judicial review 
A group of Antique dealers known as Friends of Antique Cultural Treasures (FACT), funded by the British Antique Dealers’ Association, challenged the ban in the High Court. The group were granted leave to appeal to the Court of Appeal.

On 18 May 2020, the Court of Appeal dismissing the appeal. The group were denied leave to appeal to the Supreme Court.

Commentary 
National Geographic described the ban as "one of the strictest in the world" and Reuters said that it was the "toughest ban on ivory in Europe".

References 

Ivory trade
United Kingdom Acts of Parliament 2018